Namibia Rugby Union is the governing body for rugby union in Namibia.

It was formed in March 1990, the same month that it joined the International Rugby Board.

See also
Namibia national rugby union team
Namibia Sports Commission

Rugby union in Namibia
Rugby union governing bodies in Africa
World Rugby members
Rugby
Sports organizations established in 1990